"Kryptonite" is a song written by Guy Sebastian and Beau Dozier and is the second single from Sebastian's second studio album, Beautiful Life (2004). The song was released on 22 November 2004 and peaked at No. 15 on the Australian ARIA Singles Chart.

Music video
A music video was produced to promote the single, which was shot in New Zealand during October 2004.

Track listing

Charts

References

2004 singles
2004 songs
Australian Idol
Contemporary R&B ballads
Guy Sebastian songs
Pop ballads
Songs written by Beau Dozier
Songs written by Guy Sebastian
Sony BMG singles